Hat Yai International Airport  is an international airport in southern Thailand in Songkhla Province near the city of Hat Yai. It is under the management of Airports of Thailand, PLC (AOT). It serves more than 1.5 million passengers per year, 9,500 flights and 12,000 tons of cargo.

Overview
Highway 4135 (Sanambin Panij Road) links to the airport. Its service hours are 06:00–24:00. The runway can handle 30 flights per hour and its durability is rated at PCN 60/F/C/X/T. There are seven taxiways and an apron area of 56,461 m2.

Statistics

Expansion
Expansion plans are in the works, as the airport is designed for 2.5 million passengers, was already seeing 4.5 million passengers in 2018. The upgradation will expand the airport's capacity to serve over 10 million passengers by 2030.

Airlines and destinations

Accidents and incidents
During the 2005 Songkhla bombings, a bomb planted at the departure lounge by Pattani separatists exploded on 3 April 2005, killing one passenger and injuring 10.

Gallery

References

External links
 Hat Yai International Airport, Official site

Airports in Thailand
Buildings and structures in Songkhla province